The Big Red One is a 1980 American epic war film written and directed by Samuel Fuller, and starring Lee Marvin alongside an ensemble supporting cast, including Mark Hamill, Robert Carradine, Siegfried Rauch, Bobby Di Cicco, and Kelly Ward.

Based on Fuller's own experiences, it was produced independently on a low budget, and shot on location in Israel as a cost-saving measure. It was heavily cut on its original release, but a restored version, The Big Red One: The Reconstruction, premièred at the 2004 Cannes Film Festival, seven years after Fuller's death. Fuller wrote a book with the same title, which was more a companion novel than a novelization of the film, although it features many of the scenes that were originally cut.

Background

Fuller was a World War II veteran and served with the 1st Infantry Division, which is nicknamed "The Big Red One" for the red numeral "1" on the division's shoulder patch. He received the Silver Star, Bronze Star, and Purple Heart during his service. He was present at the liberation of the Falkenau concentration camp.

Plot

World War I: In November 1918, a United States Army private kills a surrendering German Army soldier with his trench knife, thinking the surrender is a trick. When he returns to his company's headquarters, the private is told that the war ended four hours earlier.

World War II: In November 1942, the US soldier, now a sergeant in the "Big Red One", leads his squad of infantrymen through North Africa; they are initially fired on by a Vichy French general, who is then overpowered by his French troops, who are loyal to Free France. Over the next two years, the squad is part of the Allied invasion of Sicily, where they are given intelligence on the location of a Tiger I tank and are fed by grateful Sicilian women; the landing on Omaha Beach at the start of the Normandy campaign; the liberation of France, where they battle Germans inside a mental asylum; and the invasion of western Germany. The sergeant's German Army counterpart, Schroeder, participates in many of these same battles, and at different times both he and the sergeant express the same sentiment that soldiers are killers, but not murderers, though Schroeder also displays a ruthless loyalty to Hitler and Germany.

During the advance across northern France, the American squad crosses the former WWI battlefield on which the sergeant killed the surrendering German, where a memorial now stands to the earlier war. Schroeder has sprinkled his own living men among the German dead from a recent battle at this location, but the sergeant senses a trap and checks out the bodies in a burned-out tank. Noticing that the piping on the German uniforms is not consistent, he silently kills the living Germans in the tank. Feigning orders from his commander on the radio, the sergeant begins leading his men away, quietly telling them that living Germans are about. One of his new recruits sees a German move and shoots him, setting off a skirmish in which the Americans wipe out the Germans with only minor injuries in their own ranks. While the sergeant's squad are patching up their wounded, a French couple arrives on a motorcycle and sidecar. The husband dies of his previous wounds, but not before begging the sergeant to help his pregnant wife. The squad clears the tank and puts the woman, who is in active labor, in the tank. After a somewhat comical series of attempts to help the mother give birth, a child is born. Schroeder takes advantage of all of this excitement to sneak away unharmed.

The squad's final action in the war is the liberation of Falkenau concentration camp in Czechoslovakia, during which the American soldiers are shocked by what they witness. The sergeant befriends a young boy he finds in the concentration camp, but the boy dies that same afternoon. Shortly after this, the sergeant is in a forest at night when Schroeder approaches him, attempting to surrender. The sergeant stabs Schroeder and then his squad arrives and informs him that the war in Europe ended four hours earlier. This time, as the squad walks away, Private Griff notices that Schroeder is still alive; the sergeant and his men work frantically to save his life as they return to their encampment. Private Zab, in voice-over, remarks that he and his fellow American troops have more in common with this Nazi soldier, because they have all been through the war and survived, than they do with all of the replacements they may have fought alongside, but who are dead.

Cast

 Lee Marvin as the Sergeant
 Mark Hamill as Private Griff
 Robert Carradine as Private Zab
 Bobby Di Cicco as Private Vinci
 Kelly Ward as Private Johnson
 Siegfried Rauch as Feldwebel Schroeder
 Marthe Villalonga as Madame Marbaise
 Stéphane Audran as Walloon fighter
 Perry Lang as Private Kaiser
 Matteo Zoffoli as Matteo

Production
Warner Bros. was interested in filming The Big Red One in the late 1950s, sending Fuller on a trip to Europe to scout locations. Fuller directed Merrill's Marauders as a dry run for the film. When Fuller argued with Jack L. Warner and his studio over cuts they made to Merrill's Marauders, the plans for The Big Red One were dropped.

In the project's early stages, at Jack L. Warner's urging, John Wayne was lined up to play the sergeant, but Fuller felt that he was not right for the role.

Peter Bogdanovich helped set up the film at Paramount Pictures, which paid Fuller to write a script. When Paramount head Frank Yablans left the studio, though, the project was put in turnaround. It shifted over to Lorimar with Bogdanovich to produce (he says Fuller wanted him to play the Robert Carradine part), but then Bogdanovich pulled out and brought in Gene Corman to produce.

The Reconstruction 
The restored version, dubbed "the Reconstruction" and completed in 2004, adds 47 minutes to the film's running time, bringing it much closer to the form Fuller imagined before the studio took it away from him. Film critic Richard Schickel — who praised the 1980 version in Time when it was released — took the lead on the restoration, which relied on locating footage allegedly stashed in the Warner Bros. vault in Kansas City. He was aided by editor Bryan McKenzie and Bogdanovich.

Release
The film was entered into the 1980 Cannes Film Festival.

Critical reception
Review aggregator website Rotten Tomatoes reported a 90% approval rating with an average rating of 7.8/10, based on 48 reviews. For "the Reconstruction" cut, Metacritic assigned a score of 77 out of 100, based on 19 critics, indicating "generally favorable reviews".

In his review of the original, theatrical version of the film, Roger Ebert gave it  three out of four stars, and wrote: While this is an expensive epic, he hasn't fallen to the temptations of the epic form. He doesn't give us a lot of phony meaning, as if to justify the scope of the production. There aren't a lot of deep, significant speeches. In the ways that count, The Big Red One is still a B-movie – hard-boiled, filled with action, held together by male camaraderie, directed with a lean economy of action. It's one of the most expensive B-pictures ever made, and I think that helps it fit the subject. "A" war movies are about war, but "B" war movies are about soldiers.

In November 2004, Ebert gave the film four out of four stars, and added it to his list of "great movies".

The Big Red One ranks 483rd on Empire magazine's 2008 list of the 500 greatest movies of all time. Terry Lawson of the Detroit Free Press called it the greatest war movie of all time.

References

Further reading 
The Fighting First: The Untold Story of The Big Red One on D-Day by Flint Whitlock – 2004. 
The Big Red One (novel version) by Samuel Fuller – 1980; republished in 2004.

External links

 
 
 
 The Big Red One on Rotten Tomatoes
 Review of the Reconstruction
 Sam Fuller's Last Testament
 "D-Day 67 Years On" by Robert Farley on Lawyers, Guns and Money – June 6, 2011 Video Interview of Mark Hamill on his meeting with director Sam Fuller

1980 films
1980s war drama films
1980s English-language films
American war drama films
North African campaign films
Italian Campaign of World War II films
Operation Overlord films
Films directed by Samuel Fuller
United Artists films
Films produced by Gene Corman
American World War II films
Films set in Czechoslovakia
Films set in Normandy
Films set in Sicily
Films set in France
Films set in the French colonial empire
World War II films based on actual events
1980s American films